Plexippica is a genus of moths of the family Yponomeutidae.

Species
Plexippica verberata - Meyrick, 1912 

Yponomeutidae
Moth genera